Tom Thug was a long-running British comic strip, first published in Oink! in May 1986, then moved to Buster. Created by cartoonist Lew Stringer, Tom was encouraged by his skinhead father to be a school bully like he used to be. However, Tom was so incompetent he couldn't even tie the laces of his boots. As the strip progressed, every issue would show Tom's attempts at bullying backfire often with slapstick consequences.

The strip proved popular enough to transfer over to Buster when Oink! folded in 1988. Asked by the editor Allen Cummings to focus the stories on Tom at school, the strip underwent a title change to Tom Thug's Skooldayz (a spoof in name only of Tom Brown's Schooldays). There, Tom Thug continued to run until December 1999 (Buster'''s final issue), although the last couple of years were reprints of earlier stories due to budget cutbacks by the publisher. However, during its run, Tom Thug had become one of the comic's most popular strips and even replaced the lead character Buster on the cover on occasion.

In the final issue of the comic at the beginning of 2000 in a segment written and drawn by Jack Oliver, Tom Thug was revealed to have possessed great intelligence after passing all of his exams with flying colours; Tom, who had always prided himself on being a brainless bully, is disappointed to learn that he is in fact a brainy'' bully. However this was not the ending that the strip's creator Lew Stringer would have given the character.

Sources

British comic strips
1986 comics debuts
2000 comics endings
Gag-a-day comics
School-themed comics
Thug, Tom
Bullying in fiction
British comics characters
Comics set in the United Kingdom
Thug, Tom
Thug, Tom
Thug, Tom